List of canals in Oregon contains all canals identified by the USGS in the U.S. state of Oregon.  The USGS defines a canal as a manmade waterway used by watercraft or for drainage, irrigation, mining, or water power (ditch, lateral).

There are 661 listed as of December 4, 2008.

See also
 Lists of Oregon-related topics

References 

 
Oregon
Canals
Canals